, or "menu of the day", is a set menu or served by Spanish restaurants during weekday lunch, one of the largest meals of the day in Spain. It is known for being economical and large. Spanish restaurants will serve  typically between 1:30 to 4:30 p.m. This is a cheap, economic meal, typically with good food.

The  is typically a large meal, with a good price considering the amount of food. The cost ranges from 8 to 14 euros.

The  is likely to change daily. The type of food served varies with what local produce is available and with the seasons.
It is usually advertised outside of the premises.

References 

Spanish cuisine
Daily events
Recurring events established in the 20th century
Restaurants in Spain
Restaurant terminology
Lunch
Bundled products or services
Restaurant menus
Food and drink introduced in the 20th century
20th-century establishments in Spain